The Korean Wikipedia is the Korean language edition of Wikipedia. It was founded on 11 October 2002 and reached ten thousand articles on 4 June 2005.

History

The Korean Wikipedia initially used an older version of MediaWiki. The software had problems representing Hangul, which limited usage. In August 2002, the software was upgraded and started to support non-English scripts such as Hangul. However, Internet Explorer continued to have an encoding problem, which kept contributions to the encyclopedia low. Nevertheless, from October 2002 to July 2003, the number of articles increased from 13 to 159, and in August 2003 it reached 348. Finally, in September 2003 the hangul problem was solved. From September 2003, with no accessing difficulty once the encoding error in IE was solved, the number of contributions and visits increased. The Korean Wikipedia's prospects became even more optimistic following the momentum created by substantial coverage in the Korean media.

The Korean Wikipedia won the Information Trust Award in the general Internet culture branch in 2005.

Statistics

Hangul and Hanja

The Korean Wikipedia is written almost entirely in hangul. Hanja is only used in order to clarify certain phrases, and is usually parenthesized. There is a group, named Dajimo, that worked to introduce a mixed script system to the Korean Wikipedia. A request for a separate Wikipedia in mixed script, however, was rejected.

Dialects

There are two major standards in the Korean language, the South Korea standard, and the North Korea standard. North Koreans are underrepresented on the Korean Wikipedia, due to North Korean censorship of the Internet in North Korea. Therefore, most users of the Korean Wikipedia are South Koreans and most articles are written in the South Korean style. Hangugeo is the name for the Korean language in South Korea, and baekgwa is a clipped form of   "encyclopedia".

Services derived from Korean Wikipedia 

Businesses heavily make use of the Korean Wikipedia in various ways, for its license, the Creative Commons Attribution Share-Alike License (CC BY-SA), allows modification and distribution for commercial purpose.

Empas integrated the Korean Wikipedia database in its search since 11 August 2005. The feature to search Korean Wikipedia using a mobile phone with a wireless Internet connection through Nate was available to the subscribers of SK Telecom from 6 July 2007. Since 21 August, Daum mirrored Korean Wikipedia and English Wikipedia on its portal, and Naver also started to present the search results from the Korean and English Wikipedia prior to others from 11 January 2008.

Politics
The South Korean right-wing youth group story K favors proactive involvement in contributing to Korean Wikipedia.

Human rights groups have sent copies of the Korean Wikipedia to North Korea on USB sticks by balloon.

Gallery

Notes

External links

  
 Korean Wikipedia mobile version 

Wikipedias by language
Korean-language websites
Internet properties established in 2002
2002 establishments in South Korea